Thirumangalam taluk is a taluk of Madurai district of the Indian state of Tamil Nadu. The headquarters of the taluk is the town of Thirumangalam.

Demographics
According to the 2011 census, the taluk of Thirumangalam had a population of 232,548 with 116,664  males and 115,884 females. There were 993 women for every 1000 men. The taluk had a literacy rate of 70.92. Child population in the age group below 6 was 11,777 Males and 10,862 Females.

References 

Taluks of Madurai district